Chah Sharaf (also Romanized as Chāh Sharaf and Chāh-e Sharaf) is a village in Varavi Rural District, Varavi District, Mohr County, Fars Province, Iran. At the 2006 census, its population was 919, in 217 families.

References 

Populated places in Mohr County